Columbia Mall may refer to a number of shopping centers in the United States:

Avondale Mall, formerly Columbia Mall, the first enclosed shopping mall in Georgia
Columbia Mall (Grand Forks), a shopping center in Grand Forks, North Dakota
Columbia Mall (Missouri), a shopping mall in Columbia, Missouri
Columbia Mall (Tennessee), a shopping mall in Columbia, Tennessee
Columbia Colonnade, formerly Columbia Mall, a mall in Bloomsburg, Pennsylvania
Columbia Place, formerly Columbia Mall, a mall in Columbia, South Carolina
The Mall in Columbia, formerly Columbia Mall, a shopping center in Columbia, Maryland